The men's 10,000 metres walk at the 2022 World Athletics U20 Championships was held at the Estadio Olímpico Pascual Guerrero in Cali, Colombia on 5 August 2022.

30 athletes from 19 countries were originally entered to the competition, however, 28 of them competed. Ahmed Mohamed Hanafi from Egypt and Babubhai Barjod from India did not participate.

Records
U20 standing records prior to the 2022 World Athletics U20 Championships were as follows:

Results
The race (originally set for 9:35) was started at 9:38 on 5 August 2022. The results were as follows:

References

10,000 metres walk
Racewalking at the World Athletics U20 Championships